The Mall at Greece Ridge is located in Greece, New York, a suburb of Rochester, New York, and managed by Wilmorite Properties. It contains 119 stores and restaurants in the main concourse. The mall is anchored by the traditional chains Macy's, JCPenney, Dick's Sporting Goods, Burlington, a free-standing Target, and a Regal theater. Junior anchor stores include Barnes & Noble, Michaels, Old Navy, and local stalwart Ruby-Gordon.

The mall is near the center of a long line of plazas, chain hotels, restaurants, and car dealerships which continues for several miles in each direction on Ridge Road (New York State Route 104).

History 
The mall began as two shopping malls Greece Towne Mall, which opened on May 1, 1967.  The Greece Towne Mall had a Sibley's, a Loblaws, and a Gold Circle.

Long Ridge Mall, began with the opening of McCurdy's on Oct 2, 1969. A newspaper article says that the rest of the mall would start before the end of the year. The official opening of Long Ridge Plaza was on Sept. 15, 1971.

Early advertising called the mall Long Ridge Plaza but by March 1972 advertising used the name Long Ridge Mall. It was unique in that it had five anchors, Sears, Woolworth, J. B. Hunter, McCurdy's, and B. Forman Co.

In the late 1980s, talks to link the two malls to draw shoppers back to Greece escalated when new malls opened in Irondequoit and Henrietta and when plans for a massive expansion of Eastview Mall were revealed. Both malls competed against each other until March 15, 1994 when the malls merged to form The Mall at Greece Ridge. Construction began on the  expansion. When it was complete, the new  mall was renamed The Mall at Greece Ridge and at that time was the 4th largest in the eastern United States, and the 20th largest in the country. The mall is still the largest shopping center in the Rochester area.

At the time of the merger, JCPenney moved to a marquee space in the new wing that connected the two malls, across from the food court. In 1994, McCurdy's became The Bon-Ton. In September 2006, Kaufmann's became Macy's.

On April 20, 2018, It was announced Sears would shutter as part of an ongoing plan to phase out of brick-and-mortar. Several prospective tenants have been in discussion.

In January 2022, The Mall at Greece Ridge had announced newest additions Ardene, FYE (returning to the mall), and Taichi Iron BBQ Grill & Bar.

On January 19, 2023, it was announced that Regal Cinemas would close as part of a plan to close 39 theaters nationwide with the theater closing on March 9, 2023.

References

External links 
 Official Site

Shopping malls in New York (state)
Shopping malls established in 1967